Radio National, known on-air as RN, is an Australia-wide public service broadcasting radio network run by the Australian Broadcasting Corporation (ABC). From 1947 until 1985, the network was known as ABC Radio 2.

History

1937: Predecessors and beginnings
From 1928, the National Broadcasting Service, as part of the federal Postmaster-General's Department, gradually took over responsibility for all the existing stations that were sponsored by public licence fees ("A" Class licences). The outsourced Australian Broadcasting Company supplied programs from 1929. In 1932 a commission was established, merging the original ABC company and the National Broadcasting Service. It is from this time that Radio National dates as a distinct network within the ABC, in which a system of program relays was developed during the subsequent decades to link stations spread across the nation.

The beginnings of Radio National lie with Sydney radio station 2FC, which aired its first test broadcast on 5 December 1923 and officially went to air on 9 January 1924. 2FC stood for Farmer and Company, the original owner of the station before the ABC bought the station in 1937.

The ABC then rolled out a national network across the country, somewhat similar in nature to the BBC National Programme. The origins of the other stations in the network were:

3AR Melbourne – 26 January 1924 "Associated Radio Company of Australia", organised by Esmond Laurence Kiernan and others.
5CL Adelaide – 20 November 1924 "Central Broadcasters Ltd".
7ZL Hobart – 17 December 1924.
4QG Brisbane – 27 July 1925 "Queensland Government" (operated by the Queensland Radio Service, an agency within the Office of the Chief Secretary).
6WN Perth – 5 October 1938 "Wanneroo".
2CY Canberra – 23 December 1938.
2NA Newcastle – 20 December 1943.

The first transmitters for 2FC, 5CL and 4QG were made by AWA with power of 5 kW (note that until about 1931 in Australia, transmitter powers were defined in terms of DC input to final amplifier, typically about 3 times that of the power into the antenna; thus power today would be stated as about 1.7 kW). They used a MT7A valve for the final high power RF stage and a MT7B for the modulator. The power supply was 12,000 volts from three phase power rectified by MR7 valves. 4QG commenced with a 500 Watt transmitter which continued for about 6 months until the 5 kW unit was commissioned.

The radio transmitters for 3AR and 2FC were upgraded to 10 kW in a contract let in 1938 to STC. The transmitters were designed by Charles Strong in London, and were notable in using negative feedback to ensure a high quality flat frequency response.

From 1947 until the mid-1980s, "Radio 2" (as it came to be known) was broadcast to the major metropolitan centres, with a large broadcast footprint in adjacent areas due to the powerful AM transmitters in use. It contained most of the ABC's national programming.

The power level of 2FC and 3AR was upgraded to 50 kW in the early 1950s. The transmitters for these were housed in the same building as the radio 1 network. They were manufactured by STC. The final stage contained three parallel 3J/261E air cooled triodes running in class C amplifier at 90% efficiency. These were driven by a class B push-pull modulator with the same type of valves. That of 5CL had to wait until late 1961, when a new joint facility with 5AN was opened at Pimpala.

1970s–1980s
In the 1970s, the network's program format began to take on a more serious tone, a style which continues to this day. Art critic Peter Timm later remarked that the network is  "virtually the only non-print media forum for art in this country".

In the early 1980s the broadcast footprint was extended with the construction of the first of over 300 regional FM transmitters (including community re-broadcast sites). In 1985, the ABC renamed "Radio 2" as "Radio National".

1990s
Since 1990, all Radio National stations have had the same callsign, "RN".

As a result of cuts in the 1996–97 budget, Radio National was hit with a reduction of a million dollars in its funding, with a significant impact on programming.

21st century

In 2008, controversial programming changes once more raised the issue of funding cuts to the public broadcaster. Presenter Stephen Crittenden leaked confidential programming changes in an unscheduled live broadcast before the start of his show, criticising his superiors. He was suspended for his outburst, and his unscripted comments were cut from Radio National's podcast and transcript of the program. Religious commentator Paul Collins on crikey.com subsequently echoed Crittenden's fears. Crittenden was reinstated in 2009 as a reporter on Background Briefing, after a settlement was reached. However, his program and the other eight programs that had been cancelled or merged were not re-instated that year. The head of ABC Radio, Sue Howard, was dismissed in 2009.

In January 2012 Radio National was rebranded as RN, partly in recognition of the stations growing digital audience. RN has also been used as shorthand for the station's name by many presenters going back several years. The stations tagline, which has changed regularly over the years, was also changed to "Your World Unfolding" to mesh with the station's new logo and visual identity.

In 2012 a new Religion and Ethics report was launched, hosted by Andrew West. The Media Report was also relaunched, hosted by broadcaster and former Life Matters host Richard Aedy. The Media Report was, however, cancelled again in 2015.

In late 2016, the new head of the ABC, Michelle Guthrie, defended the removal of staff and programmes from the Radio National 2017 schedule. In January 2017 the schedule was reduced in scope due to loss of staff and programmes.

Description

Radio National broadcasts national programming in subjects that include news and current affairs, the arts, social issues, science, drama and comedy. Some programs are relayed on Radio Australia, the ABC's international broadcasting service which was transmitted on shortwave until January 2017, as well as 24-hour FM stations, local relay stations and live satellite.

All radio programs are available for live streaming over the Internet, and most (excluding drama, poetry and music) as audio-on-demand, or for download as MP3s for at least four weeks after broadcast. Some programs are available as MP3s going back to 2005, when Radio National commenced podcasting.

Selected programs
Some of the following programs, listed in order of start date, are aired on both Radio National and ABC Local Radio networks.
 PM (1969–present)
 Correspondents Report (before 1974–c.2019)
The Science Show (1975–present, Robyn Williams)
The Coming Out Show (1975–1998)
Ockham's Razor (1984–present, Robyn Williams, then Tegan Taylor)
 Late Night Live (1991–present, Phillip Adams)
 The Music Show (1991–present, Andrew Ford  since 1995)
 The Live Set (1986–2017)
 Life Matters (1992–present)
 RN Breakfast (1994–present, Peter Thompson 1994-2005, then Fran Kelly 2005-2021, then Patricia Karvelas)
 Conversations (2012–present)
 The National Interest (1995–2011, Terry Lane, Peter Mares)
Sound Quality (1995–2015, Tim Ritchie)
The World Today (1999–present)
 Bush Telegraph (2001–2014)
Big Ideas (c.2002–present, Paul Barclay)
 AWAYE!
 Speaking Out (1990–present, Larissa Behrendt)
 The Night Air (2002–2013)
All in the Mind (c.2003–present)
 Counterpoint (2004–present, Amanda Vanstone)
 The Art Show, formerly The Art Hub (December 2017–), hosted by Ed Ayres until mid-January 2020, when it was taken over by Namila Benson. Around July 2021 Daniel Browning became the main presenter.
 Sporty (c.2019–present, Amanda Smith)
 Sunday Extra (2019–present, Julian Morrow, including Background Briefing and Ockham's Razor, and apparently superseding Correspondents Report)

See also
Bald Hills Radiator, ABC's AM radio transmission centre in Brisbane
BBC Radio 4
List of radio stations in Australia
Radio New Zealand National
Timeline of Australian radio

References

External links

Current programs

Australian Broadcasting Corporation radio
Australian radio networks
News and talk radio stations in Australia
Public radio in Australia
Radio stations established in 1923